The Parti de la Démocratisation Économique (Party of Economic Democratization) was a group of five candidates in Quebec, Canada, who unsuccessfully sought election to the House of Commons of Canada in the 25 June 1968 federal election. Together, they won 2,651 votes, or 1.7% of the popular votes in the ridings in which they ran.

 Source: Parliament of Canada History of the Federal Electoral Ridings since 1867

See also
 List of political parties in Canada

Federal political parties in Canada